Yupo is a tambon (subdistrict) of Mueang Yala District, in Yala Province, Thailand. In 2017 it had a total population of 6,932 people.

Administration

Central administration
The tambon is subdivided into 6 administrative villages (muban).

Local administration
The whole area of the subdistrict is covered by the subdistrict municipality (Thesaban Tambon) Yupo (เทศบาลตำบลยุโป).

References

External links
Thaitambon.com on Yupo

Tambon of Yala Province